Bolshezingereyevo (Olo Ziñgäräy) is a rural locality (a selo) in Nizhneulu-Yelginsky Selsoviet, Yermekeyevsky District, Bashkortostan, Russia. The population was 188 as of 2010. There are 4 streets.

Geography 
Bolshezingereyevo is located 12 km southeast of Yermekeyevo (the district's administrative centre) by road. Nizhneulu-Yelga is the nearest rural locality.

References 

Rural localities in Yermekeyevsky District